Syroloma is a genus of spiders in the family Lycosidae. It was first described in 1900 by Simon. , it contains two species from Hawaii.

References

Lycosidae
Araneomorphae genera
Spiders of Hawaii